Sextus Lucilius Bassus was the 2nd Roman legate appointed by Emperor Vespasian to Iudaea Province in 71.

Biography
Assigned to finish off the last remnants after the First Jewish–Roman War in the province, he led the legion Legio X Fretensis, destroying the Jewish strongholds Herodium and Machaerus on their march to the siege of Masada.

Bassus fell ill and died on the way, however, and was replaced by Lucius Flavius Silva in late 72. 

Before his appointment to Iudaea, Bassus was prefect of the Classis Ravennas and the Classis Misenensis  and betrayed Vitellius by siding with Vespasian during the Year of the Four Emperors (69).

Citations

See also
 Gens Lucilia

External links
 Wars of the Jews by Flavius Josephus
 The Histories by Cornelius Tacitus

70s deaths
Year of birth unknown
Year of death uncertain
Ancient Roman admirals
1st-century Romans
1st-century Roman governors of Judaea
Bassus, Sextus Lucilius
Bassus